Princess Maria Anna of Bavaria (27 January 1805 – 13 September 1877), known as 'Marie' was Queen of Saxony from 1836 to 1854 as the second wife of King Frederick Augustus II of Saxony.

Biography 

Maria Anna was born in Munich, the daughter of Maximilian I Joseph of Bavaria and his second wife, Karoline of Baden. She was the identical twin sister of Princess Sophie of Bavaria, mother of Emperor Franz Joseph I of Austria and Emperor Maximilian I of Mexico. She and her sister were their parent's second set of twins. Their younger sister, Ludovika, was mother of Empress Elisabeth of Austria and Queen Maria Sophie of the Two Sicillies.

Marriage
On 24 April 1833 in Dresden, Maria married Frederick, Crown Prince of Saxony, whose brother Prince John of Saxony was married to her sister Amalie. In 1836, Frederick succeeded his uncle Anthony as king, making her queen. There were no children from the marriage. Her husband, King Frederick Augustus II, died in 1854.

In 1836, during the great famine of Erzgebirge and Vogtland in Saxony, Maria Anna organized the first women committees to help, "Frauenvereinsanstalt der obererzgebirgischen und vogtländischen Frauenvereine" — this was in 1859 renamed "Zentralausschuß der obererzgebirgischen und vogtländischen Frauenvereine" and existed until 1932. She constructed the chapel Gedächtniskapelle in 1855. She is known as the correspondent of the writer Ida von Hahn-Hahn (1805–1880).

Maria Anna died in Wachwitz, Dresden, aged 72.

Ancestry

Literature 
 Martha Schad: Bayerns Königinnen. Piper, 2005

Footnotes

External links

|-

1805 births
1877 deaths
House of Wittelsbach
Saxon queens consort
Bavarian princesses
Saxon princesses
German twins
Burials at Dresden Cathedral
Nobility from Munich
Crown Princesses of Saxony
German Roman Catholics
⚭Maria Anna of Bavaria (1805–1877)
Daughters of kings